The Alien Act was a law passed by the Parliament of England in February 1705, as a response to the Parliament of Scotland's Act of Security of 1704, which in turn was partially a response to the English Act of Settlement 1701. Lord Godolphin, the Lord High Treasurer, was instrumental in the Union of 1707 and all the Acts leading up to it. The Alien Act was passed to prevent the inconveniences that would occur hastily if these two Kingdoms were not to become one Union.

The Alien Act provided that Scottish nationals in England were to be treated as aliens (foreign nationals), and estates held by Scots would be treated as alien property, making inheritance much less certain. It also included an embargo on the import of Scottish products into England and English colonies – about half of Scotland's trade, covering goods such as linen, cattle and coal. There was also an embargo on the export of arms, ammunition, and horses to Scotland so that they could not raise an army and invade England. Faced with the economic pressure the Scots decided to join England in union, something that certain interests in England had wanted for over a century. With the Union in 1707 free trade was established along with a single parliament.

The Act contained a provision that it would be suspended if the Scots entered into negotiations regarding a proposed union of the parliaments of Scotland and England. The Act demanded that a settlement of succession or authorize union negotiation by December 25, 1705. The Scots insisted that the Alien Act be repealed before entering into treaty negotiations. In late December, news that both the Commons and the Lords had agreed to repeal the act reached the north. Combined with English financial offers to refund Scottish losses on the Darien scheme, the Act achieved its aim, leading to the Acts of Union 1707 uniting the two countries as the Kingdom of Great Britain.

References

Acts of the Parliament of England
1705 in law
1705 in England
1705 in Scotland
Political history of England
Political history of Scotland
Economic history of England
Economic history of Scotland
Trade in Scotland
England–Scotland relations
Trade in England
Embargoes
British nationality law
Immigration law